Club de Aventuras AD (CAAD) is the current main group of Spanish interactive fiction players and creators. CAAD's activities are mainly centered on its webpage, its forums, SPAC fanzine, chat gratis #caad and the Spanish if wiki, WikiCAAD.

Adventure creation is also encouraged from CAAD through competitions, including the Premios Hispanos de la Aventura.

References

External links
 CAAD - Home page
Premios Hispanos Annual Spanish IF Competition.

Spanish-language works
Interactive fiction